The Whakatāne River or Ōhinemataroa is a major river of the Bay of Plenty region in the North Island of New Zealand.

It flows north from near the small town of Ruatāhuna through Te Urewera, reaching the sea through the town of Whakatāne.

References

Rivers of the Bay of Plenty Region
Rivers of New Zealand